Sphalloeme costipennis is a species of beetle in the family Cerambycidae, the only species in the genus Sphalloeme.

References

Xystrocerini
Monotypic beetle genera